See:

United States Army enlisted rank insignia
United States Army enlisted rank insignia of World War I
United States Army enlisted rank insignia of World War II
United States Military warrant officer rank insignia
United States Army officer rank insignia